LittleBe (stylized as little Be) is a British children's preschool television programming block broadcast by ITVBe. The block was launched on 3 September 2018. The block airs at 9:00 am to 12:00 pm on weekends and weekdays. This block is aimed at 2–6-year-olds.

History 
On 4 July 2018, the block was announced at the Children's Media Conference. tentatively without a name. It was eventually named LittleBe and launched on 3 September 2018.

The block is similar to the Mini CITV block that CITV used to broadcast before the network removed all preschool shows from the channel.

On 30 August it was announced that Sooty would move to the block from its original broadcaster, CITV.

Development 
Jason Ford from ITV Creative made coordination with Bubble to create visual effects and animation for the block's promos and brand. Greg Claridge and James Taylor are the composers of the block's music and sound effects.

Jason Ford had stated for the development:

Programmes 

Programmes on the block are aimed toward a preschool audience and range from acquisitions such as Pingu in the City, and original series such as Sooty.

References

External links 
 

2018 establishments in the United Kingdom
Children's television
Children's television networks

ITV (TV network) original programming
Preschool education television networks
Television programming blocks